Robin L. Bartlett is a professor of economics at Denison University. She was among the founders of the International Association for Feminist Economics (IAFFE), and served as its president from 2005 to 2006.

Education 
Robin Bartlett gained her degree from Western College, Oxford, Ohio. She then went to Michigan State University where she earned her masters and doctoral degrees.

Advice 
She gives the following advice to young female economists:

Selected bibliography

Books

Journal articles

See also 
 Feminist economics
 List of feminist economists

References 

21st-century American economists
Date of birth missing (living people)
Denison University faculty
Feminist economists
Living people
Michigan State University alumni
Western College for Women alumni
Year of birth missing (living people)
Presidents of the International Association for Feminist Economics